John Frank Wilson (May 7, 1846 – April 7, 1911) was a Delegate from the Territory of Arizona.

Born near Pulaski, Tennessee, Wilson moved with his parents to Alabama and attended the common schools and Rhuhama (Alabama) College. He served in the Confederate States Army as a member of Company B, First Battalion, Volunteer Infantry, and later on staff duty under General Hindman until 1863, after which he served as lieutenant colonel of a regiment.
He studied law and was admitted to the bar in 1866 and commenced practice in Fayetteville, Arkansas.
He served as member of the Arkansas House of Representatives in 1877 and 1878.
He served as prosecuting attorney for the fourth judicial district in 1885 and 1886.

Wilson moved to the Territory of Arizona and settled in Prescott in 1887, where he continued the practice of law.
He served as member of the constitutional convention in 1891. He was probate judge of Yavapai County 1893–1895.
He served as delegate to the Democratic National Convention in 1896.
He was appointed attorney general of the Territory of Arizona by Governor Franklin and served during 1896 and 1897.

Wilson was elected as a Democrat to the Fifty-sixth Congress (March 4, 1899 – March 3, 1901). Wilson was elected to the Fifty-eighth Congress (March 4, 1903 – March 3, 1905).
He was not a candidate for renomination in 1900 and 1904.
Afterwards he resumed the practice of his profession.
He died in Prescott, Arizona, and was interred in Mountain View Cemetery.

Sources

External links
 

1846 births
1911 deaths
People of Alabama in the American Civil War
Members of the Arkansas House of Representatives
Delegates to the United States House of Representatives from Arizona Territory
Confederate States Army officers
Democratic Party members of the United States House of Representatives from Arizona
Arizona Attorneys General
19th-century American politicians
Politicians from Prescott, Arizona
People from Pulaski, Tennessee